TV KRT Dalga (or just KRT) (North Macedonia Cyrillic: ТВ КРТ Далга) was a local television channel in Kumanovo, North Macedonia.

See also
Kumanovo

References

External links
  YouTube page

Television channels in North Macedonia
Mass media in Kumanovo